Burghardt Wittig (born 1947 in Celle, Germany) is the chairman of MolBio2Math and a professor of biochemistry and molecular biology at Freie Universitaet Berlin in Berlin (FUB), Germany. His research focuses on the areas of gene regulation, DNA structures induced by torsional strain, chromatin structure, G-protein-mediated signal transduction, as well as therapeutic applications of genetic research and DNA-based vaccines. His research has been published in numerous leading scientific journals, including Cell, Nature, PNAS, and Science.

Early life 
Wittig was born in Celle, Germany, where he attended the classical "Gymnasium Ernestinum". He graduated by the German Abitur in fall 1966, followed by two years of service in the German military.

Career and Research
Wittig enrolled at Freie Universitaet Berlin in 1968 to study medicine. While attending medical school, he also received training as an engineer specialised in hearing aids (audiologist) and graduated by the German Gesellenpruefung. During his time as a medical student at Freie Universitaet Berlin, Wittig joined laboratories at the Institute of Molecular Biology and Biochemistry and at the Max Planck Institute for Molecular Genetics to conduct the experiments for his MD thesis. He was principally mentored by Hubert Gottschling but received further advice from V.A. Erdmann, O. Pongs, H.-J. Risse, H. Tiedemann and H.G. Wittmann as well. Having concluded his medical studies in 1975, Wittig successfully defended his thesis on "Purification and Characterisation of the Four Lysine-Specific Transfer Ribonucleic Acids from Chicken Embryos" (German: Reinigung und Charakterisierung der vier lysinspezifischen Transfer-Ribonukleinsäuren aus Hühnerembyronen) in 1976. He stayed at Freie Universitaet as a postdoc until 1978, and as an assistant professor from 1978 to 1987.

From 1976 to 1986, Wittig attended a variety of physics courses  in addition to his principal work as a researcher. These classes led him as a visiting student to Technische Universitaet Berlin, California Institute of Technology (Caltech) and Massachusetts Institute of Technology (MIT). He received no official degree for these courses.

In 1980, Wittig habilitated for "Biochemistry and Molecular Biology" and became thus formally eligible for a full professorship in Germany. For the 1982/83 cycle, Wittig was awarded a Heisenberg scholarship of the Deutsche Forschungsgemeinschaft; he continued to work as a fellow of the programme until 1989. During this time, he spent time at the labs of Edward Trifonov at the Weizmann Institute of Science, Rehovot, and Koki Horikoshi, at Riken. 

From 1984 to 1986, Wittig worked as a visiting professor at Alexander Rich's lab at MIT, where he also cooperated with Alexander Varshavsky. Wittig would later describe these years as "the most career-shaping of [his] life".

In 1987, Freie Universitaet Berlin awarded Wittig an extraordinary professorship. He continued to work as a visiting professor at Alexander Rich's lab until 1989, when he became a Schering professor (S-C4, full tenure) at Freie Universitaet Berlin. In 1988, he became the fully tenured founding chair and department head of Molecular Biology and Bioinformatics at Freie Universitaet's Institute of Molecular Biology and Biochemistry. After a change of the relevant laws of the state of Berlin merged parts of Freie Universitaet and Humboldt Universitaet into the Charité – Universitaetsmedizin, Wittig became director of its newly founded Institute of Molecular Biology and Bioinformatics. 

Beginning in 1994, Wittig focused his research on the design, development, and clinical proof-of-concept of covalently closed DNA constructs for the treatment of cancer and for DNA-vaccines against infectious diseases.

Guided by the goal of facilitating the independent transition from basic research into clinical DNA-based medicines, Wittig founded Mologen AG in 1998. The firm had their IPO at the German stock exchange in the same year. He served as Mologen AG's CEO until 2007, while continuing to work as a full professor in a private-public-partnership. 

In 2010, Wittig's institute returned to Freie Universitaet Berlin as a non-profit foundation with Freie Universitaet as the trustee. He served as the chairman of this newly created Foundation Institute of Molecular Biology and Bioinformatics until 2017. 

In late 2019, Wittig founded MolBio2Math, a non-profit foundation under the trusteeship of the Gentechnologiestiftung - Dr. Georg und Ingeburg Scheel Stiftung, of which he is currently the chairman

Selected publications 

 
 Allfrey VG, Arnott S, Bradbury EM, Bayev A, Chambon P, Crick FHC, Felsenfeld G, Mirzabekov AT, Noll M, Stern H, van Holde KE, Wittig B, Zachau HG, and Zweidler A (1976) „The Structure of Chromatin“ in: Organization and expression of chromosomes: Dahlem Konferenzen Life Sciences Research Report, 4; Allfrey AG, Bautz EKF, McCarthy BJ, Schimke RT, Tissieres A (Eds.) pp. 19–27;  / , Abakon Verlagsgesellschaft, Berlin.
 
 
 
 

 

 
 
 
 
 
 
 
 
 
 
 
 
 
 
 
 
 Schmidt M, Schroff M, Wittig B (2020) „Harnessing the Therapeutic Potential of Dendritic Cells” in:  Second Generation Cell and Gene-based Therapies, pp. 183–202; Alain A. Vertès, Devyn M. Smith, Nasib Qureshi, Nathan J. Dowden (Eds.) , Academic Press, London
 O'Halloran J, Kedar E, Anstrom KJ, McCarthy MW, Ko ER, Segura Nunez P, Boucher C, Smith PB, Panettieri RA, Mendivil Tuchia de Tai S, Maillo M, Khan A, Mena Lora AJ, Salathe M, Capo G, Rodriguez Gonzalez D, Patterson TF, Palma C, Ariza H, Patelli Lima M, Lachiewicz AM, Blamoun J, Nannini E, Sprinz E, Mykietiuk A, Alicic R, Rauseo AM, Wolfe CR, Wittig B, Benjamin DK, McNulty SE, Zakroysky P, Halabi S, Butler S, Atkinson J, Adam SJ, Melsheimer R, Chang S, LaVange L, Proschan M, Bozzette SA, Powderly WG. Infliximab for Treatment of Adults Hospitalized with Moderate or Severe Covid-19. medRxiv [Preprint]. 2022 Sep 26:2022.09.22.22280245. doi: 10.1101/2022.09.22.22280245. PMID: 36172138; PMCID: PMC9516856.

References

External links 

Burghardt Wittig on researchgate
patents by Burghardt Wittig on patents.justia.com
Mologen AG website
FUB alumni article on Mologen AG
Google Scholar report
Burghardt Wittig on the website of MolBio2Math - Molecular Biology & Integral Biomathics

1947 births
Living people
German molecular biologists
Academic staff of the Free University of Berlin
People from Celle
